Ochrodota affinis is a moth of the subfamily Arctiinae first described by Rothschild in 1909. It is found in Brazil.

References

Phaegopterina